Fábio Santos (born April 4, 1956) is a Brazilian jiu-jitsu practitioner and instructor.

Biography
Santos graduated with a BA in physical education from the Universidade Gama Filho. Upon immigrating to the United States, Santos taught in Rorion Gracie's academy in Torrance, California. He later opened his own academy in San Diego, California.

In the early UFC events, Santos can be seen ringside with the Gracie family and Pedro Sauer, most notably in UFC 3 when he entered the ring to yell at Joe Son who had been taunting the corner after a fatigued and dehydrated Royce Gracie defeated Joe's friend, Kimo Leopoldo.

Fabio Santos is featured in MMA Sports magazine, where he has a column called Jiu-Jitsu 101.

It is widely believed that Dean Lister received his black belt from Santos, since Santos was Lister's jiu-jitsu instructor up to brown belt. However, it was Santos's student Jeffrey Higgs.

Instructor lineage
Kano Jigoro → Tomita Tsunejiro → Mitsuyo "Count Koma" Maeda → Carlos Gracie, Sr. → Helio Gracie → Rickson Gracie → Fábio Santos

Awards
 1996 World Jiu-Jitsu Champion
 1996 Pan American Champion
 1999 Gameness Champion
 2000 World Jiu-Jitsu Champion
 2003 Pan American Champion
 2003 US Open- Black Belt Masters Champion
 2004 United Gracie- Black Belt Superfight Champion
 2005 Black Belt Pro Am- Superfight Champion

See also
List of Brazilian Jiu-Jitsu practitioners

References

Brazilian practitioners of Brazilian jiu-jitsu
People awarded a coral belt in Brazilian jiu-jitsu
Living people
1956 births
Sportspeople from Rio de Janeiro (city)